Saperda octomaculata is a species of beetle in the family Cerambycidae. It was described by Blessig in 1873. It is known from China, Russia, Japan and Mongolia.

References

octomaculata
Beetles described in 1873